The "Battle of the East" is a college basketball rivalry between the University of the East Red Warriors and Far Eastern University Tamaraws. Others would refer to it as the Battle of Morayta, because of the street that runs between these universities. They have a combined 38 UAAP Basketball titles.

History
FEU left the National Collegiate Athletic Association in 1936 and later on to form the University Athletic Association of the Philippines along with University of Santo Tomas, National University and the University of the Philippines in 1938. UE was part of the first UAAP expansion with Adamson University in 1952. It did not take long for the Warriors to dominate since joining the league as it holds the longest finals appearance with 16 from 1957 to 1972, including a seven straight title run from 1965 to 1971(1967 title to be shared with UST), with FEU winning the title in 1961 and 1972.

Notable Games

1960 UAAP Finals
UE stormed back from 81-75 with three minutes left to play at the half to complete an upset, 87-86 taking the El Oro trophy home in front of a crowded Rizal Memorial Coliseum. A run started with Norman de Vera's two free throws after being fouled by Rohimust Santos to cut the lead, while sophomore Rizaldo Pabillore came up with two interceptions all within the last three minutes of the second half to earn their third title.

1961 UAAP Second Round Eliminations
UE subdued FEU, 78-74 in the second round of the UAAP basketball series at the Rizal Memorial Coliseum. But the jam-packed crowd of 9,000 (over maximum capacity of the coliseum) got an unexpected show after the final buzzer when cagers from both teams engaged in an impromptu brawl on the floor. The fight was triggered off by a last-second scuffle for the ball between Tamaraw Romy Diaz and Warrior Carlos Quitzon. Quitzon had the ball and was being harassed by Diaz when the buzzer sounded and hell broke loose. Searing blast by lanky Jimmy Mariano and clutch baskets by Jose Sison and Wenceslao Olaguera at the homestretch saved the Warriors after they were behind by six points. Mariano scored twice on a twisting shot to regain the lead for UE, 63-60, with five minutes left in the game. The two schools met again in the finals with FEU winning the championship.

1981 UAAP Finals
With the game on the line, University of the East rookie Allan Caidic, with the chance of beating the rival FEU to win the championship, missed both free throws and let the Tamaraws led by Glenn Capacio steal the 1981 title. Caidic, with the rest of UE squad, won the championship the following year after beating the University of the Philippines.

2009 UAAP Semifinals
Holding a twice to beat advantage, the second-seeded Tamaraws fell short during the Game 1 of the series, 74-84, without their sophomore guard Mark Barroca, who was accused of game-fixing prior to his performance on the team's last stretch of the elimination. Going on to the second game of the series, a much favored FEU, despite a 49-39 lead at the half, once again took the beating as Paul Lee and the Warriors pulled an upset and entered the finals with the score of 72-78 to face Ateneo.

Game Results 
FEU victories are colored ██ green.  UE victories are colored ██ red.asterisk denotes a post season gamedouble asterisk denotes a second seed play-off''

See also
Ateneo–La Salle rivalry
La Salle–UST rivalry
UP–UST rivalry

References

University Athletic Association of the Philippines rivalries
Far Eastern University
University of the East